Van Sickle Island is an approximately  island in Suisun Bay, California. It is part of Solano County, and administered by Reclamation District 1607. The island's land is divided into 22 privately-owned parcels, used primarily for duck clubs and private residences. A railroad bridge constructed in 1913 once connected it to Montezuma and Chipps Island, from which a ferry connected to Mallard Island and Pittsburg. The rail service was discontinued and the bridges no longer exist; currently, the island is accessible by water, as well as by road on bridges from Hammond Island and Wheeler Island.

Geography and ecology 

Van Sickle Island is located in Suisun Bay, an embayment of San Francisco Bay in Northern California. It is on the eastern edge of Suisun Marsh, at the terminus of Montezuma Slough, among a number of marsh islands separated primarily by creeks and sloughs. Van Sickle Island contains  of managed wetlands. It is within the Grizzly Island Unit of the primary management area defined in 1976 by the San Francisco Bay Conversation and Development Commission's Suisun Marsh Protection Plan, which says that "despite the private nature of this use and the restricted number with access to the Marsh, club owners provide a public benefit in the maintenance of the waterfowl and wildlife habitat".

It is bordered on the north by Hammond Island (across Roaring River Slough), on the northwest by Wheeler Island, on the west by Honker Bay (itself an embayment of Suisun Bay), on the southwest by Chipps Island (across Spoonbill Creek), on the south and southeast by Suisun Bay, on the east by Montezuma (across Montezuma Slough), and on the northeast by Spinner Island.

One bridge connects the levee road at the northeast corner of Van Sickle Island to the levee road on Hammond Island, which can be reached by automobile from mainland via Grizzly Island. Another two connect to Wheeler Island on the northwest corner, both to the same road; the southern end of this road travels west across Wheeler Island and eventually recedes into the water, while the northern end connects to Hammond Island. On the eastern tip of Van Sickle Island, two levee roads connect to Spinner Island (which has no mainland road access).

By 2009, 22 people lived on Van Sickle Island, which was divided among 22 parcels; in 2017, it was home to "around 20" duck clubs. A 2009 report prepared for the Solano Local Agency Formation Commission said that there were "no expectations for growth or development of the island".

History 
Like many islands and tracts of land in Suisun Bay and the Sacramento–San Joaquin River Delta, Van Sickle Island was reclaimed in the mid-19th century by dredging sloughs and using the material to construct levees. Water inside the levees was then drained, resulting in a large tract of fertile land that was used for raising cattle, as well as farming beans and tules.

The cost of levee maintenance, however, gradually increased to the point of making farming unprofitable; subsequently, the area "became a haven for waterfowl hunting and recreation".

The island, historically, was referred to by a number of names, including "Jones Island", "Van Sickle Island", "Van Sickles Island" and "Van Sickle's Island". It is shown as "Jones Island" on an 1850 survey map of the San Francisco Bay area made by Cadwalader Ringgold, as well as an 1854 map made by Henry Lange. However, an 1891 decision by the Board on Geographic Names Decisions established its name as Van Sickle Island.

Reclamation district 

On November 25, 1914, Reclamation District 1607 was established to handle drainage, irrigation, and levee maintenance. The island was subdivided into several parcels, upon which landowners pay assessments to fund District operations. The district is governed by a five-member Board of Trustees, elected by the landowners to serve 4-year terms. The Board meets several times per year, and members are not compensated for their roles. In addition to Board members, the district has two part-time employees: a secretary who performs some routine levee inspections, and another who coordinates various levee maintenance activities.

In the 21st century, the reclamation district generates its revenue primarily from assessments, in which landowners pay an annual fee of $10 per acre ($2,471 per square kilometre), and grants from other governmental agencies, including the California Department of Water Resources. In 2008 the district reached an agreement with Venoco, a company which operates several natural gas wells on the island, in which Venoco pays $50,000 per year for the right to drive service equipment on the island's levees.

In 2018, an effort remained ongoing to find a buyer for the island; negotiations had stalled with the Department of Water Resources, and several private equity firms had signed nondisclosure agreements but not made offers.

In August 2019, the reclamation district had not raised its assessment fees since 1998.

In September 2018, several owners of duck clubs on the island were attempting to negotiate for access to their properties; the owner of the Four G Ranch Duck Club had erected a gate and "[would] not let anyone through". Attorney Garrett Deal said that there would be a combination lock on the fence, and that the club owner would give the combination to all clubs' owners and members who signed a Right of Entry and Release of All Claims Agreement (RERACA) furnished by the club owner's attorney, George Kammerer. In October, the Board of Trustees claimed that the club owner had failed to provide access to the roads in question pursuant to the agreement, and had dumped loads of gravel on the road to make it inaccessible (even for vital tasks such as levee maintenance); they then made a resolution to enter a lawsuit with the affected landowners to restore their access to the road, and selected secretary Chris Lanzafame to work with Deal in the case. In November 2019, the attempt to acquire an easement over club owner's road was ongoing, and the Wreck Slough Club had begun allowing club members locked out of the road to use their property for ATV parking. By May 2020, the Reclamation District had started an eminent domain action to obtain the easement.

Levees 

There are 12 miles of levees surrounding Van Sickle Island; in 2009, there were three pumping stations used to drain the island of water, both due to deliberate flooding (performed for waterfowl management) and unintentional flooding (due to extreme wind or tidal fluctuations). Of these pumps, one was owned by RD 1607, and two were owned privately.

The levees on Van Sickle Island have been overrun and breached numerous times; in 1914,  of grain were ruined when the levees broke.

In December 1983, levee breaches were responsible for multiple floods in the Delta, including Bradford Island; Van Sickle Island was inundated completely.

In January 1997, severe storms in California caused a major disaster declaration on January 4; Reclamation District 1607 submitted Damage Survey Reports to the Federal Emergency Management Agency for $46,788 of levee repair and other associated tasks. FEMA declined the request, and a February 1998 appeal from the district, citing their failure to meet a 1991 Hazard Mitigation Plan compliance deadline. A second appeal, in December 1998, said that the compliance deadline had not been met due to subsoil instability; this appeal was declined as well.

In January 2017, a king tide was caused by the syzygy of the Sun, Earth and Moon;  of levees in the Suisun Marsh sustained heavy damage as a result. Steve Chappell, the executive director of the Suisun Resource Conservation District, described the damage to Van Sickle Island's levees as "the worst" affected; on January 12, one large breach overran  of them, and the island flooded within hours.

In February 2019, water overtopped several levees, but this did not lead to major levee failure.

In September 2020, the Board authorized $40,000 to be spent on repairing levees adjacent to the Sacramento River, $22,400 on a pump project at the River Dog Retreat, and $24,500 for a canal gate replacement near the Hit & Miss Club. Up to $40,000 was also approved for repairs on the Honker Bay levee, which sustained heavy damage in the 2017 floods and had not been repaired since.

Sacramento Northern Railway 

The Oakland, Antioch and Eastern railway, incorporated in 1913, constructed an electrified railroad from Oakland to Sacramento. While a bridge was planned to cross Suisun Bay, this plan never materialized; a wooden ferry "Bridgit" was constructed in 1913 (and replaced by an all-steel ferry "Ramon" in 1915), which moved trains between West Pittburg and Chipps Island. Directly to the north, trains crossed Van Sickle Island on a long trestle between Chipps and the Montezuma stop. The railway would later be absorbed into the Sacramento Northern Railway, which continued to operate on the route passing through Van Sickle Island.

Passenger service would continue until 1941, and freight service would continue to pass through Van Sickle Island until April 7, 1954, when the "Ramon" ferry was decommissioned. Trains to Sacramento were subsequently routed through the Atchison, Topeka and Santa Fe Railway from Pittsburg to Stockton. Today, the vast majority of Sacramento Northern railway lies dormant, including the trackage on Van Sickle Island; the rail bridges connecting it to Montezuma and Chipps Island no longer exist.

References

External links
Official website

Islands of the San Francisco Bay Area
Islands of Northern California
Islands of Solano County, California
Islands of Suisun Bay